Ndidi Nnoli-Edozien (born July 31, 1972) is a Nigerian social entrepreneur and corporate sustainability and responsibility (CSR) expert and Bottom of the Pyramid empowerment advocate. She is the Founder and President of the Growing Businesses Foundation, Nigeria's largest Bottom of the Pyramid platform which has been managing CSR Projects for multinational corporations. Her status as a social entrepreneur has been recognized by the Bertelsmann AG to whom she is affiliated as a Reinhard Mohn Fellow.

At the Africa Conference on Women in Governance, Business and Community Leadership and Women of Influence Awards in London 2010, she received the African Star Excellence Award in Business Development. A member of the International Finance Corporation (IFC), Nnoli-Edozien has contributed to policy reforms in Nigeria through her work with government ministries and agencies.

Education

Nnoli-Edozien was born in Karlsruhe City in Germany and she graduated from Queen's College Lagos in 1989 and studied at the London School of Economics and Political Science, United Kingdom earning a BSc in Economics. Nnoli-Edozien gained her master's degree from Johann Wolfgang Goethe University, Frankfurt am Main, Germany in Catholic Theology before undertaking her PhD at the Johann Wolfgang Goethe University in the area of “ownership and management structures” with a global focus on the global applicability of African Models of Corporate Governance and Sustainability.

She is an alumnus of the Wharton Business School and has attended executive programmes at INSEAD and the Judge Business School, Cambridge. She teaches, part-time, ethics, social entrepreneurship and sustainability at the Lagos Business School.

Career

October 1999, Nnoli-Edozien founded the Growing Businesses Foundation as a platform to support enterprise development at the Bottom of the Pyramid in Nigeria.

In January 2001, Nnoli-Edozien founded the Micro-enterprise Development Co-operation, MDC is a platform for evaluating international best practices in micro-finance for building self-reliant and sustainable financial intermediaries that  nurture and grow small businesses into viable and socially responsible service providers.

From November 2004 to December 2005, Nnoli-Edozien served as the African Representative of the Bank für Orden und Mission, Germany.

In January 2011, she joined the Central Organizing Committee of the Nigerian Economic Summit Group (NESG).

In April 2011, Nnoli- Edozien accepted to become a member of the National Committee on Job Creation in  Nigeria which was chaired by Aliko Dangote and inaugurated to develop an action plan for job creation in Nigeria.

In January, 2012 Nnoli-Edozien was nominated by the International Finance Corporation as a Director of AB Microfinance Nigeria.

In February 2012, she was appointed by the Federal Ministry of Communication Technology as part of a team member convened by the Honourable Minister of ICT to draft a comprehensive ICT policy for Nigeria.

Bibliography

 Ownership and Management Structures in the Economy: African Traditional Values Applied to Modern Issues of Sustainability and the Corporate Governance Function”, 2007 CIDJAP Printing Press,
 Africa Fund on Sustainability Micro-finance Bank: Our Role towards Economic Development and Poverty Alleviation in Nigeria, 2005 Joint Publication, CIDJAP Press, 
 Development is about People, Business is about Ethics, 2003, CIDJAP Joint Publication, Enugu, 
 Afrika in Eigener Sache: Weissheit, Kultur und Leben der Igbo (IKO Verlag fuer Interkulturelle Kommunikation, Frankfurt/London, 2003,  Die Reihe Ezi-Muoma Afrika Verstehen Nr. 1; Herausgeber: Ike/Hoffmann
 Understanding Africa: Traditional Legal Reasoning, Jurisprudence & Justice in Igboland; (CIDJAP Joint Publication, 2001, Enugu)

References

Ownership and Management Structures in the Economy: African Traditional Values Applied to Modern Issues of Sustainability and the Corporate Governance Function”, 2007 CIDJAP Printing Press,
Africa Fund on Sustainability Micro-finance Bank: Our Role towards Economic Development and Poverty Alleviation in Nigeria, 2005 Joint Publication, CIDJAP Press, -22.	Development is about People, Business is about Ethics, 2003, CIDJAP Joint Publication, Enugu, -23.	
Afrika in Eigener Sache: Weissheit, Kultur und Leben der Igbo (IKO Verlag fuer Interkulturelle Kommunikation, Frankfurt/London, 2003,  Die Reihe Ezi-Muoma Afrika Verstehen Nr. 1; Herausgeber: Ike/Hoffmann)
Understanding Africa: Traditional Legal Reasoning, Jurisprudence & Justice in Igboland; (CIDJAP Joint Publication, 2001, Enugu)

External links 

 Growing Businesses Foundation
 Bank für Orden und Mission, Germany
 AB Microfinance Nigeria
 Global Symposium for Women’s Entrepreneurship

1972 births
Living people
Nigerian ethicists
Goethe University Frankfurt alumni
Alumni of the London School of Economics
Nigerian businesspeople
Queen's College, Lagos alumni
Social entrepreneurs